Pipestone Creek is a waterway that runs through central Alberta, Canada.

It originates east of Pigeon Lake and flows east. It is crossed by Highway2, Highway 2A, Highway 13, and the Canadian Pacific Railway tracks before it empties into the Battle River east of Wetaskiwin.

Tributaries include the Bigstone Creek, Huard Lake and Coal Lake. Long Lake and Watelet Lake are developed on the course of the creek.

This creek is unrelated to Pipestone Creek and Fossil Bed near Grande Prairie, Alberta.

See also 
 List of rivers of Alberta
 Pipestone Creek (Saskatchewan)
 Pipestone River (disambiguation)

References

Rivers of Alberta
Tributaries of Hudson Bay